The Iranian Anti-Vivisection Association (IAVA) is a nonprofit nongovernmental science-based organization. It's the first animal rights advocacy group in Iran which professionally campaigns for lab animal rights‌‌. In 2012, IAVA was recognized as Iran's most active animal rights group and was awarded the Brown Bear statuette by Iran Animal Rights Watch and a number of environmental parties.

History
IAVA was founded by a number of Iranian graduate students, from various medical science fields, as well as vegan and animal rights advocates in 2009. The group's current director is Dr. Ramak Roshanaie Moghaddam.

Philosophy and activism
IAVA's activism is mainly focused on the reduction and replacement of animal experimentation through encouraging the development and implementation of alternative methods in the academic community across the country, particularly aimed at medicine and veterinary education and research.

To establish a humane education, training, knowledge and skill acquisition process, IAVA's mission is to ‌raise awareness of the widespread suffering of lab animals along with the promotion of animal testing alternatives by introducing and providing innovative learning tools, organizing workshops, outreach to individual academic figures and specialists, initiating a body donation program in cooperation with shelters and clinics to eliminate the need for purpose-killed animals, publishing professional materials and communicating with fellow international organizations to name a few.

Academic relations
In order to refine the country's current research and training approach, IAVA has participated in numerous national and international veterinary and animal science congresses. In this regard, papers, documents, booklets, slideshow presentations, leaflets, posters and videos have also been designed, published and distributed.
In case of academic relations, IAVA has arranged a couple of independent seminars in universities including Tehran, Garmsar, Shiraz and Shahriar faculties of veterinary science.

International relations
IAVA is now working in partnership with the International Network for Humane Education (InterNICHE) and is also supported by other organizations such as American Anti-Vivisection Society's educational branch (Animalearn) and International Association Against Painful Experiments on Animals (IAAPEA) and Physicians Committee for Responsible Medicine.

Publications
Darman-e Pak (meaning "refined medicine" in English), an online periodical dedicated to lab animals, is the first Persian publication which critically challenges the use of animals in medical research and introduces viable alternative methods and non-animal tools.

Achievements
As a result of IAVA's efforts to protect animals used for scientific purposes, the issue of animal experimentation has turned to a heated topic and a serious concern to Iran's medical and veterinary education community.

Among the group's achievements is the successful deployment of available alternatives such as the use of donated ethically sourced animal cadavers (i.e. those that are morally obtained from free living, companion, stray or shelter animals who have died by natural causes or in accidents), software programs, computer simulators and manikins in anatomy, pathology, physiology and pharmacology classes. In 2012, IAVA was recognized as Iran's most active animal rights group by Iran Animal Rights Watch and a number of environmental parties.

See also
 InterNICHE
 Humane education
 National Anti-Vivisection Society
 American Anti-Vivisection Society
 The Humane Society of the United States
 British Union for the Abolition of Vivisection
 Physicians Committee for Responsible Medicine
 Fund for the Replacement of Animals in Medical Experiments
 European Partnership for Alternative Approaches to Animal Testing
 List of animal rights groups

References

External links
  (in Persian)

Animal testing in Iran
Animal welfare and rights in Iran
Animal welfare organisations based in Iran
Anti-vivisection organizations
Humane education
Organizations established in 2009